Norman Bingley (17 September 1863 – 16 January 1940) was an English sailor and Olympic Champion for Great Britain. He competed at the 1908 Summer Olympics in London and won a gold medal in the 7 metre class.

References

External links
 
 

1863 births
1940 deaths
British male sailors (sport)
English Olympic medallists
Olympic sailors of Great Britain
Olympic gold medallists for Great Britain
Olympic medalists in sailing
Sailors at the 1908 Summer Olympics – 7 Metre
Medalists at the 1908 Summer Olympics